Virgil George "Blood" Miller was a college football player and track and field athlete for the Sewanee Tigers of Sewanee: The University of the South. He later went to Tampa. Miller was selected All-Southern in 1922 by Marvin McCarthy, sporting editor of the Birmingham Age-Herald, a year in which he drew praise for his work against Oglethorpe. He won the Porter Cup as Sewanee's best all-around athlete.

References

American football ends
Sewanee Tigers football players
All-Southern college football players